The men's single event at the 2016 World Singles Ninepin Bowling Classic Championships was held in Novigrad, Croatia. Qualification took place on 23-24 May, while the knock-out phase from 26 May to 28 May 2016.

Results

Qualification 

32 players qualified for the knock-out phase. 

|}

Finals 
According to the results of the qualification, 32 players were put together in bouts, which took place on standard match rules - 4 sets of 30 throws. The competitor who obtains a larger number of sets wins. With an equal number of sets decides a higher total score.

References 

2016
Men's single